

Past seasons

Episodes

Nicaragua (Season 21, 2010)

Redemption Island (Season 22, 2011)

South Pacific (Season 23, 2011)

One World (Season 24, 2012)

Philippines (Season 25, 2012)

Caramoan (Season 26, 2013)

Blood vs. Water (Season 27, 2013)

Cagayan (Season 28, 2014)

San Juan del Sur (Season 29, 2014)

Worlds Apart (Season 30, 2015)

Cambodia (Season 31, 2015)

Kaôh Rōng (Season 32, 2016)

Millennials vs. Gen X (Season 33, 2016)

Game Changers (Season 34, 2017)

Heroes vs. Healers vs. Hustlers (Season 35, 2017)

Ghost Island (Season 36, 2018)

David vs. Goliath (Season 37, 2018)

Edge of Extinction (Season 38, 2019)

Island of the Idols (Season 39, 2019)

Winners at War (Season 40, 2020)

Future seasons

References

External links 
 
 

Survivor (American TV series)
Lists of American reality television series episodes